Burley is a city in Cassia and Minidoka counties in southern Idaho, United States. The population was 11,704 at the 2020 census, up from 10,345 in 2010. The city is the county seat of Cassia County.

Burley is the principal city of the Burley, Idaho, Micropolitan Statistical Area, which comprises Cassia and Minidoka counties. Burley is the third-largest city in Idaho's Magic Valley region after Twin Falls, and Jerome. Along with nearby Rupert, it forms the bulk of the "Mini-Cassia" area of southern Idaho.

History
A post office called Burley has been in operation since 1905. The community was named after David Ellsworth Burley, a railroad official.

Geography
Most of the city lies in Cassia County, with a small portion extending north into Minidoka County. The Snake River forms the border between the two counties. On the north side of the river, Burley is bordered to the east by the city of Heyburn.

U.S. Route 30 passes through the center of Burley, leading northeast to Interstate 84 in Heyburn and west  to Kimberly. I-84 passes through the northern end of Burley, leading west  to the Twin Falls area and southeast  to Ogden, Utah. Idaho State Highway 27 passes through the center of Burley, leading north  to Paul and south  to its terminus in Oakley, while State Highway 81 leads east from Burley  to Declo.

Climate
Burley experiences a semi-arid climate (Köppen BSk) with cold winters and hot, dry summers. Burley is also host to incredibly high wind speeds. In 2008, a group of local farmers sued the Idaho BLM (Bureau of Land Management) because pesticides that the Burley BLM office sprayed on their lands were carried by a wind storm onto farmers’ lands, effectively destroying crops.

Demographics

2010 census
As of the census of 2010, there were 10,345 people, 3,644 households, and 2,499 families living in the city. The racial makeup of the city was 77.2% White, 0.4% African American, 1.0% Native American, 0.7% Asian, 17.4% from other races, and 3.3% from two or more races. Hispanic or Latino of any race were 33.4% of the population.

There were 3,644 households, of which 40.1% had children under the age of 18 living with them, 49.7% were married couples living together, 13.0% had a female householder with no husband present, 5.9% had a male householder with no wife present, and 31.4% were non-families. 26.9% of all households were made up of individuals, and 12.8% had someone living alone who was 65 years of age or older. The average household size was 2.76 and the average family size was 3.37.

The median age in the city was 30.8 years. 31.8% of residents were under the age of 18; 9.7% were between the ages of 18 and 24; 24.9% were from 25 to 44; 20% were from 45 to 64; and 13.6% were 65 years of age or older. The gender makeup of the city was 49.6% male and 50.4% female.

2000 census
As of the census of 2000, there were 9,316 people, 3,288 households, and 2,373 families living in the city. The racial makeup of the city was 77.96% White, 0.21% African American, 1.30% Native American, 0.46% Asian, 0.08% Pacific Islander, 17.15% from other races, and 2.83% from two or more races. Hispanic or Latino of any race were 26.71% of the population.

There were 3,288 households, out of which 39.5% had children under the age of 18 living with them, 55.7% were married couples living together, 12.7% had a female householder with no husband present, and 27.8% were non-families. 25.0% of all households were made up of individuals, and 12.2% had someone living alone who was 65 years of age or older. The average household size was 2.75 and the average family size was 3.31. The average home price for real estate in Burley] is around $35,000.

In the city, the population was spread out, with 31.9% under the age of 18, 10.0% from 18 to 24, 25.5% from 25 to 44, 18.1% from 45 to 64, and 14.5% who were 65 years of age or older. The median age was 31 years. For every 100 females, there were 94.8 males. For every 100 females age 18 and over, there were 90.1 males.

The median income for a household in the city was $27,981, and the median income for a family was $33,376. Males had a median income of $26,865 versus $17,304 for females. The per capita income for the city was $12,689. About 15.2% of families and 18.4% of the population were below the poverty line, including 25.1% of those under age 18 and 10.7% of those age 65 or over.

Arts and culture
Burley is home to the famed "Spudman" Triathlon and the Idaho Regatta.

In popular culture
Burley was the setting of the X-Files episode "Patience". Although the episode is set in Burley, it was filmed in Los Angeles, California.

Education

The Cassia County portion of Burley is a part of the Cassia County School District
 Dworshak Elementary School (Burley)
 John V Evans Elementary School (Burley)
 Mountain View Elementary School (Burley)
 White Pine Elementary (Unincorporated Cassia County)
 Burley Junior High School (Burley)
 Burley High School
 Declo Elementary School (Declo)
 Declo Junior High (Declo)
 Declo High School (Declo)
 Oakley Elementary School (Oakley)
 Oakley Jr/Sr High School (Oakley)
 Raft River Elementary School (Malta) 
 Raft River Jr./Sr. High School (Malta)
The Minidoka County portion of Burley is a part of the Minidoka County Schools.

Residents of Minidoka County Burley are zoned to:
 Heyburn Elementary School (Heyburn)
 West Minico Middle School (Unincorporated Minidoka County)
 Minico High School (Unincorporated Minidoka County)

Notable people
 Steve Antone, former Republican member of the Idaho House of Representatives
 Denton Darrington, former Republican member of the Idaho State Senate
 Henry Dworshak, former Republican member of the United States House of Representatives and the United States Senate
 John V. Evans, former D. L. Evans Bank president and Democratic Governor of Idaho
 Shaun Graham, visual effects animator for video games, television and film
 William Norman Grigg, journalist, magazine editor and constitutionalist author
 Parley G. Hellewell, former Republican member of the Utah State Senate
 Bryant "Babe" Hiskey, retired PGA Tour professional golfer
 Darrell Huntley, actor
 Kent Jensen, musician
 Troy Merritt, professional golfer
 Pete Nielsen, incumbent Republican member of the Idaho House of Representatives
 George W. Pace, author and former professor of religion at Brigham Young University
 Cheryl Paris, actress
 Gary Peacock, jazz bassist best known for his work with Albert Ayler and in the Keith Jarrett Trio
 Barbara Jane Reams, actress
 Ron Romanick, former Major League Baseball pitcher (California Angels) and bullpen coach (Oakland Athletics)
 M. Phil Senini, actor, screenwriter and production assistant
 Mike Simpson, incumbent Republican member of the United States House of Representatives
 Fred Wood, incumbent Republican member of the Idaho House of Representatives
 Calvin E. Wright, former Democratic Idaho State Auditor (1939-45), Democratic nominee for Idaho Governor (1950), Cassia County Clerk (1935-37), Idaho State Director of the Internal Revenue Service (1951-1973)

See also
 List of cities in Idaho

References

External links
 
 

Cities in Cassia County, Idaho
Cities in Idaho
Cities in Minidoka County, Idaho
Burley, Idaho micropolitan area
County seats in Idaho
Populated places established in 1905
1905 establishments in Idaho